The Pavillon de Marsan or Marsan Pavilion was built in the 1660s as the northern end of the Tuileries Palace in Paris, and reconstructed in the 1870s after the Tuileries burned down at the end of the Paris Commune. Following the completion of the joining of the Louvre and the Tuileries in the 1850s and the demolition of the Tuileries' remains in the early 1880s, it is now the northwestern tip of the Louvre Palace. Since 1897 it has been part of the Musée des Arts Décoratifs, a separate institution from the Louvre.

History
The pavilion was originally built in 1666, based on a design by Louis Le Vau. The exterior was similar to that of its southern pendant, the Pavillon de Flore. On its south side, the Pavillon de Marsan was connected to Le Vau's pavilion for the stage of the Théâtre des Tuileries, completed in 1661. On the Pavillon de Marsan's east side, Le Vau constructed the first bay of the North Wing, heading toward the Louvre. The south façade of the North Wing replicated the courtyard façade of its southern pendant, the Grande Galerie. For each of these façades Le Vau employed the giant order, which had first been used over sixty years earlier by Henri IV's architect(s) for the Pavillon de Flore, the Petite Galerie of the Tuileries and the western section of the Grande Galerie.

The pavilion took its current name from her. At the time when the royal family inhabited the Tuileries during the French Revolution, Madame Adélaïde had her apartment on the pavilion's ground floor.

The complete merger of the Tuileries and the Louvre would only be accomplished a half-century later with Napoleon III's Louvre expansion.

In 1820 Henri V, the Count of Chambord was born here.

In 1871 the Pavillon de Marsan burned down together with the Tuileries Palace. Its ruins were entirely demolished and the pavilion reconstructed by Hector Lefuel from 1874 to 1879. Lefuel, who disliked the giant order as a matter of principle and found it unsuitable for the Louvre, went on to reconstruct the North Wing on a slightly broadened footprint, but works to that end stopped around the time of his death in 1880. As a consequence, the North Wing is now divided into Lefuel's  (Marsan Wing) to the west and Percier and Fontaine's  (Rohan Wing) to the east.

A project to locate the Cour des Comptes in the Pavillon de Marsan was stillborn, even though the building was used in the late 19th century to store archives of that institution. The Arts Décoratifs Library opened in 1904 and the Musée des Arts Décoratifs opened in May 1905.

Decoration

The pavilion is adorned with abundant architectural sculpture, as with other parts of Lefuel's work at the Louvre. An unusual feature is the use of copper for the wings of an allegorical winged lion above the southern pediment facing the Carrousel Garden, created by Théodore-Charles Gruyère in 1878.

See also
 Pavillon de Flore

Notes

Louvre Palace
Buildings and structures in Paris